Anne Neu Brindley is an American politician from Minnesota. A Republican, she has served as the Representative for Minnesota's legislative district 32B since 2017.

On September 8, 2016, the Minnesota Supreme Court ruled that Republican Bob Barrett, the incumbent representative of district 32B, was ineligible to be a candidate. Barrett's name remained on the ballot, but the results were not certified and a special election was held on February 14, 2017. Neu won the special election against Democrat Laurie Warner. In 2018 she was elected to a full term. Kurt Daudt appointed her Deputy Republican Leader on November 27 for the current legislative session.

Neu Brindley received her bachelor's degree in family studies from Brigham Young University. She lives in North Branch, Minnesota, and previously served on the North Branch Planning Commission. Neu Brindley is involved in three Minnesota House committees: Health and Human Services Policy, Rules and Legislative Administration, and the Subcommittee on Elections.

Neu Brindley was Chip Cravaack's campaign manager during his successful bid for the United States House of Representatives in 2010. Their campaign unseated longtime Democrat Jim Oberstar and gave the 8th district of Minnesota its first Republican representative in  years.

Political positions

Abortion and physician-assisted suicide
A social conservative, Neu Brindley opposes abortion and physician-assisted suicide. She voted yes on HF 812, which would have established abortion facility license requirements, and for HF 812, which would have banned state funding from being used to pay for abortions in the state. In 2019, Neu Brindley, along with the majority of the House Republican caucus, opposed the Equal Rights Amendment bill introduced by Representative Mary Kunesh-Podein because it was not "abortion neutral", and voiced concern that it could be used to expand abortion rights in the state. She was given a perfect score by Minnesota Citizens Concerned for Life in the last legislative session.

Gun control
Neu Brindley opposes most gun control measures and was rated 93% by the NRA in 2017. She has received a perfect score from the Minnesota Gun Owners Caucus in 2019, a gun advocacy group in the state.

Healthcare
In 2019, Neu Brindley spoke out against the reinstatement of the Minnesota provider tax, which she claimed would raise the cost of healthcare in the state. She introduced several amendments to the House's healthcare omnibus bill to attempt to exempt patients with cancer and other high-cost conditions from paying the tax.

Neu Brindley believes the opioid epidemic "is a crisis". In 2018 she voted to appropriate money towards relevant research and treatment options. In 2019 she voted against HF 400, which intended to create an Opioid Stewardship Advisory Council and appropriate additional money for treatment and prevention of opioid addiction because of imprecise language, the mechanism of funding, and the delayed commencement of funds.

Other
Neu Brindley sponsored a bill in 2018 that closed loopholes surrounding snowmobile and ATV use for those convicted of DWIs. It was signed by Governor Mark Dayton.

Personal life
Neu Brindley has five children. Her first husband died from ALS. She remarried in 2020. She is a member of the Church of Jesus Christ of Latter-day Saints in the North Branch ward.

Notes

External links

 Official campaign website

Living people
Year of birth missing (living people)
People from North Branch, Minnesota
Brigham Young University alumni
Women state legislators in Minnesota
Republican Party members of the Minnesota House of Representatives
Latter Day Saints from Minnesota
21st-century American politicians
21st-century American women politicians